The Doon School Model United Nations (DSMUN) is an annual model United Nations conference run by The Doon School, an all-boys boarding school in Dehradun, India. Founded in 2007, it is one of India's largest MUNs in terms of number of delegates and committees. It is held on the school campus on a weekend in August. The conference receives students from all over the Indian subcontinent, including Pakistan, Nepal, Bangladesh, as well as in recent years from Dubai and Oman.

General information
DSMUN was founded as an intra-school conference in 2007. Over the years, it attracted local schools and then, later, from across the Indian subcontinent and beyond, becoming one of India's largest conferences. It is considered one of the most prestigious MUNs in the Asia-Pacific region, regularly drawing over 350 delegates from over 30–40 schools.

Committee sessions
Committees include United Nations General Assembly, the Security Council, subcommittees of ECOSOC and crisis simulation committees. Delegates represent different countries to debate current international and regional issues. In recent years, special non-conventional committees have been devised at DSMUN, inspired by the local politics of the region or landmark historical decisions and events, such as Lincoln's War Cabinet (1861), Union Cabinet of Ministers (1984), Viceroy's Executive Council (1946) a Lok Sabha simulation, cabinet meetings of Russia, India and China, and a special convention on religion and terror.

Social events
Apart from the usual committees and debates, social and cultural events are held for the delegates, including music concerts, dance evening, tea and formal dinner.

Guest speakers

Chief guests and guest speakers at the conference usually feature prominent Indian politicians or diplomats. In the recent years, they've included:

 2013 – Salman Khurshid, Jairam Ramesh
 2015 – Sujatha Singh
 2016 – Pavan Varma
 2017 – Rahul Gandhi
 2018 – Kalikesh Narayan Singh Deo
 2019 – Yashvardhan Kumar Sinha
2021 – Kiren Rijiju, Kalikesh Narayan Singh Deo

See also
 The Doon School
 Asia-Pacific Model United Nations Conference
 List of model United Nations conferences
 Model United Nations

References

External links 
 Official DSMUN website

Model United Nations
The Doon School